Buddhism, an Indian religion founded by Gautama Buddha, first arrived in modern-day Afghanistan through the conquests of Ashoka, the third emperor of the Maurya Empire. Among the earliest notable sites of Buddhist influence in the country is a bilingual mountainside inscription in Greek and Aramaic that dates back to 260 BCE and was found on the rocky outcrop of Chil Zena near Kandahar.  

XXIX); Lokaksema, a 2nd-century Kushan monk, travelled to the Chinese capital city of Luoyang during the reign of the Han dynasty, and was the first translator of Mahayana Buddhist scriptures into the Chinese language.

The Nava Vihara monasteries, located near the ancient city of Balkh in northern Afghanistan, functioned as the centre of Buddhist activity in Central Asia for centuries.

The religion began to decline in Afghanistan after its conquest by Arab Muslims following the rise of Islam in the 7th century CE; it saw further decline in the region during the Muslim Ghaznavid era of the 10th–12th centuries. Buddhism was eliminated in Afghanistan by the 13th century during the Mongol conquests, with no further mention of a Buddhist presence in the area past the 14th century.

History

The territory within the borders of Afghanistan has seen many cultural and religious shifts over the centuries. The geographical position of the area between the Middle East, South Asian, and Central Asian cultures, and the proximity to the famous Silk Road (connecting East Asian and Mediterranean civilizations, and others in between), have been major drivers of local historical and cultural developments. One major influence was the conquest of the area by Alexander the Great, which incorporated the area for a time into the Hellenistic World, and resulted in a strong Hellenistic influence on Buddhist religious art in that region. In 305 BC, the Seleucid Empire made an alliance with the Indian Maurya Empire. The Mauryans brought Buddhism from India and controlled the area south of the Hindu Kush until about 185 BC when they were overthrown.

At the time of these developments, most of the area belonged to the kingdoms of Bactria and Sogdiana, including the Scythians, followed Buddhism until the arrival of Islam.

After the Mauryan Empire, Buddhism also flourished under the Kushan Empire, when a tribe called the Yuezhi conquered Bactria and entered the region of modern day Afghanistan. Many monuments testify to the Buddhist culture in present-day Afghanistan. Additional historical detail can be researched under Pre Islamic Hindu and Buddhist heritage of Afghanistan and Hinduism in Afghanistan.

Soon after the Sassanian Persian dynasty fell to the Muslims (in 651 AD), the Nava Vihara monastery in Balkh came under Muslim rule (in 663 AD), but the monastery continued to function for at least another century. In 715 AD, after an insurrection in Balkh was crushed by the Abbasid Caliphate, many Persian Buddhist monks fled east along the Silk Road to the Buddhist Kingdom of Khotan, which spoke a related Eastern Iranian language, and onward into China. Nava Vihara's hereditary administrators, the Persian Barmakids, converted from Buddhism to Islam after the monastery's conquest and became powerful viziers under the Abbasid caliphs of Baghdad. The last of the family's line of viziers, Ja'far ibn Yahya, is a protagonist in many tales from the Arabian Nights. In folktales and popular culture Ja'far has been associated with a knowledge of mysticism, sorcery, and traditions lying outside the realm of Islam.

The Buddhist religion survived the Islamic conquest of Afghanistan by the Umayyads and rule by the Abbasid Caliphate. Buddhism in Afghanistan was effectively destroyed in the 13th century by Mongol armies during the Mongol conquests.

Archaeological finds

Bamiyan monastery library
One of the early Buddhist schools, the Mahāsāṃghika-Lokottaravāda, were known to be prominent in the area of Bamiyan. The Chinese Buddhist monk Xuanzang visited a Lokottaravāda monastery in the 7th century CE, at Bamiyan, Afghanistan, and this monastery site has since been rediscovered by archaeologists. Birchbark and palm leaf manuscripts of texts in this monastery's collection, including Mahāyāna sūtras, have been discovered at the site, and these are now located in the Schøyen Collection. Some manuscripts are in the Gāndhārī language and Kharoṣṭhī script, while others are in Sanskrit and written in forms of the Gupta script. Manuscripts and fragments that have survived from this monastery's collection include the following source texts:

 Pratimokṣa Vibhaṅga of the Mahāsāṃghika-Lokottaravāda (MS 2382/269)
 Mahāparinirvāṇa Sūtra, a sūtra from the Āgamas (MS 2179/44)
 Caṃgī Sūtra, a sūtra from the Āgamas (MS 2376)
 Vajracchedikā Prajñāpāramitā Sūtra, a Mahāyāna sūtra (MS 2385)
 Bhaiṣajyaguru Sūtra, a Mahāyāna sūtra (MS 2385)
 Śrīmālādevī Siṃhanāda Sūtra, a Mahāyāna sūtra (MS 2378)
 Pravāraṇa Sūtra, a Mahāyāna sūtra (MS 2378)
 Sarvadharmapravṛttinirdeśa Sūtra, a Mahāyāna sūtra (MS 2378)
 Ajātaśatrukaukṛtyavinodana Sūtra, a Mahāyāna sūtra (MS 2378)
 Śāriputrābhidharma Śāstra (MS 2375/08)

Buddhist relics
In August 2010, it was reported that approximately 42 Buddhist relics have been discovered in Mes Aynak of the Logar Province in Afghanistan, which is south of Kabul. Some of these items date back to the 2nd century according to Archaeologists. Some Buddhist sites were found in Ghazni. The items in Logar include two Buddhist temples (Stupas), Buddha statues, frescos, silver and gold coins and precious beads.

Buddhist sites 
 Tepe Narenj
 Bamiyan
 Haḍḍa
 Tapa Sardar
 Tapa Shotor
 Takht-i-Rustam
 Mes aynak
 Chakhil-i-Ghoundi Stupa
 Tepe Kafiriyat

Buddhist historical figures from Afghanistan
 Prajñā, 9th-century Buddhist monk from what is now Kabul
 Barmakid family, hereditary monks of the Nava Vihara monastery close to Balkh prior to their conversion to Islam

Gallery

See also

Buddhism in Central Asia
Great Tang Records on the Western Regions
Jñānagupta
Kandahar Greek Edicts of Ashoka
Kandahar Bilingual Rock Inscription
Pre-Islamic Hindu and Buddhist heritage of Afghanistan
Silk Road transmission of Buddhism
Decline of Buddhism in the Indian subcontinent
Hinduism in Afghanistan
Trapusa and Bahalika

References

External links

web.singnet.com.sg
StudyBuddhism.com
folk.uio.no

 
Afghanistan
Ancient history of Afghanistan
Archaeological sites in Afghanistan